Maj-Britt Johansson (14 November 1928 – 31 May 2015) was a Swedish archer who represented Sweden at the 1972 Summer Olympic Games in archery.

Olympics 

Johansson competed in the women's individual event and finished nineteenth with a total of 2283 points.

References

External links 
 Profile on worldarchery.org

1928 births
2015 deaths
Swedish female archers
Olympic archers of Sweden
Archers at the 1972 Summer Olympics
20th-century Swedish women